Martha Maria Twisleton-Wykeham-Fiennes is an English film director, writer and producer. Fiennes is best known for her film Onegin (1999), which starred her elder brother, Ralph, and her subsequent film Chromophobia (2005).

Career
Fiennes made her directorial debut with the film Onegin – an adaptation of Alexander Pushkin's verse novel Eugene Onegin, which starred her brother Ralph in the title role. The film received much praise, and she won the Best Director Award at the Tokyo Film Festival and the Best Newcomer at the London Film Critics' Circle. Fiennes wrote her second feature film in 2005, Chromophobia, an original multi-stranded drama, which comprised an all star cast and which closed the Cannes Film Festival of 2005.

Personal life
Fiennes was born in Suffolk, England to photographer Mark Fiennes (1933–2004) and novelist Jennifer Lash (1938–1993). Her siblings are actors Ralph Fiennes and Joseph Fiennes, documentary film maker Sophie Fiennes, composer Magnus Fiennes, and Jacob Fiennes, a conservationist.

She has three children with George Tiffin: Titan Nathaniel Fiennes Tiffin (born 26 August 1995), Hero Beauregard Faulkner Fiennes Tiffin (born 6 November 1997) and Mercy Jini Willow Fiennes Tiffin (born 15 October 2001).

Her son Hero, at the age of nine, played a young version of his uncle Ralph's character, Lord Voldemort, in Harry Potter and the Half-Blood Prince. Her daughter Mercy was featured in the 2008 film, The Duchess as the Duchess of Devonshire's daughter, Georgiana (Little G).

Awards and nominations

Notes

References

External links
  UK
 Martha Fiennes judged The Film of the Month competition in April 2009 on the independent filmmakers networking site Shooting People.

Living people
English film directors
English film producers
English people of Scottish descent
English people of Irish descent
English women film directors
Martha
People from Suffolk
People educated at St Mary's School, Shaftesbury
People educated at Lady Margaret School
Year of birth missing (living people)